Fogarty's Cove is a 1977 folk music album by Stan Rogers.

The CD was one of several Stan Rogers albums reissued in 2011 by Borealis Records. The reissued CDs featured completely new cover artwork.

Track listing

References

1977 albums
Stan Rogers albums